Linnavuoriana is a genus of true bugs belonging to the family Cicadellidae.

he species of this genus are found in Europe.

Species:
 Linnavuoriana antiqua Dworakowska, 1982 
 Linnavuoriana decempunctata (Fallen, 1806)

References

Cicadellidae
Hemiptera genera